Illya Dmytrovych Zubkov (born 21 April 1998) is a Ukrainian professional footballer who plays as a striker for Metalist 1925 Kharkiv.

Career
Born in Kyiv, Zubkov is a product of the local Dobro, Voskhod and Dynamo Kyiv youth sportive school systems.

After playing in the Czech Republic and Austria, he returned to Ukraine. In September 2021 Zubkov signed a contract with Metalist 1925 Kharkiv and made his debut for this club in the Ukrainian Premier League as a second half substitute in the losing home match against FC Dynamo Kyiv on 11 September 2021.

He was also called up to the different Ukrainian youth representations.

References

External links 
 
 
 Profile at Roteiro.cz

1998 births
Living people
Footballers from Kyiv
Ukrainian footballers
Ukrainian expatriate footballers
Ukrainian Premier League players
Ukrainian First League players
Bohemian Football League players
FC Dynamo Kyiv players
FC Dynamo-2 Kyiv players
SK Benešov players
FC Sellier & Bellot Vlašim players
Bohemians 1905 players
Kapfenberger SV players
FC Alians Lypova Dolyna players
FC Metalist 1925 Kharkiv players
Association football forwards
Ukraine youth international footballers
Ukraine under-21 international footballers
Expatriate footballers in the Czech Republic
Ukrainian expatriate sportspeople in the Czech Republic
Expatriate footballers in Austria
Ukrainian expatriate sportspeople in Austria